William Falconer Brown (20 October 1922 – 27 May 1978) was a Scottish football player and manager. He played for Preston North End, Queen of the South, Elgin City and Grimsby Town, then managed Barrow from July 1958 to August 1959.

References

1922 births
1978 deaths
Sportspeople from Larkhall
Scottish footballers
Association football fullbacks
Preston North End F.C. players
Queen of the South F.C. players
Elgin City F.C. players
Grimsby Town F.C. players
English Football League players
Scottish Football League players
Scottish football managers
Barrow A.F.C. managers
English Football League managers
Footballers from South Lanarkshire